Turtle Wax is an American manufacturer of automotive appearance products. The company was founded by Benjamin Hirsch in Chicago in 1941 and is currently headquartered in Addison, Illinois, having relocated from Willowbrook, Illinois in 2016.

Hirsch's main product, a liquid car wax, was initially called Plastone, until Hirsch changed the product name to create the association with a turtle's hard shell. Hirsch died in 1966 and successive generations of his family have remained involved with the company. Its advertising jingle ("Turtle Wax gives that hard shell finish"), created early in its history by the Doner Company, was very well known. The Turtle Wax brand became strongly identified with television game shows, as it was often given to losing contestants as a parting gift.

Turtle Wax is the largest automotive appearance products company in the world and distributes its products in more than 90 countries.

Products
The company's primary product lines include cleaning and polishing products for cars including glass, painted surfaces, uncoated metals, leather, wheels, and tires. As of 2017, Turtle Wax primarily serves the retail consumer market; the company sold its Professional Products arm focused on professional detailer and commercial car wash customers to Cambridge, Ontario based Transchem Inc. in 2013. Turtle Wax has marketed its cleaning products for non-automotive applications, as well.

Turtle Wax also offers automotive performance chemicals such as engine treatment products and formula oils under the Marvel Mystery Oil and CD-2 brands. Additionally, the company operates full-service car wash facilities in the Chicago Metropolitan area.

The Turtle Wax Pro brand is now separately operated by Transchem Group based in Cambridge, ON, Canada.

References

Further reading

 The Spokesman Review
 Boca Raton News
 Fortune
 Star News
 Bangor News
 International Directory of Company Histories. pp. 468–470. 
 A Passion for Winning. pp. 43–44.
 The Telegraph
 Crain's Chicago Business

External links 
Turtle Wax Global homepage

Automotive chemicals
Waxes
Manufacturing companies based in Illinois
Companies based in DuPage County, Illinois
Chemical companies established in 1941
Addison, Illinois
1941 establishments in Illinois
American brands